Badiv is a village in the Berehove Raion of Zakarpattia Oblast, Ukraine. , its population was 546.

See also
 List of villages in Zakarpattia Oblast

References 

Villages in Berehove Raion